The Grêmio Recreativo Escola de Samba Paraíso do Tuiuti is a samba school in Rio de Janeiro, located in the neighborhood of São Cristóvão.

In performance of Paraíso do Tuiuti, from the beginning, was discreet, but in 1968, with the plot of Julius Matos honoring the neighborhood of São Cristóvão, takes the first place in Group 3 and goes to the Group 2. In the following year gets the third place in Group 2, with a point behind of the Jacarezinho, vice champion. In fact, until the early 1980s almost nobody heard from school, but from then on, the school lived a moment of great euphoria, thanks to the efforts of the carnival Maria Augusta Rodrigues, who gave the title of the group for the school that had no patron, a phenomenon that is typical of large schools, which confer fame and prestige to their approaches

The Paradise of the Tuiuti could not rely only on the small grant journal to cope with the high expenses that the Carnival, with the characteristics that took in our days, requires. At the end of the decade of the 1990s, the school has not ceased to grow and become stronger, until, invited to participate in the Group A in 2000, presented the story about Dom Pedro II and was vice-champion, the tie with the school just in time, acquiring the right to parade in 2001 in the Special Group.

In the Special Group, the school told the story of a school that came out of Spain, toward Mecca and ended in Brazil, fighting in the Quilombo dos Palmares. Considered as a zebra of the Access Group A in 2000, the school adopted it as a pet, and brought them in Africa. The school had many problems with their floats. After 16 years he returned the elite of the samba. Where only due to maneuver of allegories of the own school and the tragedy of the Tijuca.

Classifications

References 

Samba schools of Rio de Janeiro
1954 establishments in Brazil